Louis Antoine de Gontaut-Biron, duc de Biron (1700–1788) was Duke of Biron and a French military leader who served with distinction under Louis XV, and was made a Marshal of France in 1757.

He was the fourth son of Charles-Armand de Gontaut, duc de Biron, and Marie-Antoinette, Duchesse de Lauzun. He joined the army as an adolescent. He fought in Italy (attack on the Milan castle, Tortona and the Battle of San Pietro). In the War of the Austrian Succession, he participated in 1741 in the invasion of Moravia and the Siege of Prague, where he was badly wounded. In 1745, during the Battle of Fontenoy, he became a hero, when he took over the command of a regiment of Gardes Françaises after its commander had been killed, and saved the difficult situation the regiment was in. He became Marshal of France at the beginning of the Seven Years' War. Biron was very popular amongst his soldiers. It is said that some of his men risked their lives to save his, when in 1770 Biron was caught in a stampede caused by fireworks. In 1753, he bought the Hôtel Biron from Anne, Duchess of Maine, which still can be visited today as it houses the Musée Rodin. After his death, the title of Duc de Biron passed to his nephew Armand Louis de Gontaut.

External links
 Dynasty of Gontaut

1700 births
1788 deaths
Biron, Louis Antoine de Gontaut
Louis Antoine de Gontaut
Louis Antoine
18th-century peers of France